Horsetail Falls (or Horse Tail Falls) is a waterfall located on Horsetail Creek along the Columbia River Gorge in Multnomah County, in the U.S. state of Oregon. The falls drop over a cut over the columnar basalt cliff within the Oneonta Gorge. It is one of the waterfalls along the Columbia River Highway's waterfall corridor.

Access
The waterfall is easily accessed, in contrast to its near neighbor Oneonta Falls, as it is right next to the Historic Columbia River Highway. The shape of the falls and the rounded rockface over which it flows cause it to resemble a horse's tail.

There are actually two waterfalls along the creek. The upper falls, called Upper Horsetail Falls or Ponytail Falls, can be accessed from a footpath.

Horsetail Falls Bridge
The Historic Columbia River Highway passes across Horsetail Falls on a bridge, the Horsetail Falls Bridge, which is listed on the National Register of Historic Places as a contributing structure. It is a  reinforced concrete slab span. The bridge was built in 1914 and is unique in its design in which it has been strengthened in 1998 from its original constitution by fibre-reinforced plastic.

Gallery

See also
List of bridges documented by the Historic American Engineering Record in Oregon
List of bridges on the National Register of Historic Places in Oregon

References

External links

Waterfalls of Oregon - Horsetail

Columbia River Gorge
Historic Columbia River Highway
Horsetail waterfalls
Waterfalls of Multnomah County, Oregon
Mount Hood National Forest
Waterfalls of Oregon